Auburndale is an upper-middle-class neighborhood in the northern part of the New York City borough of Queens, between Bayside and Murray Hill.

The name comes from Auburndale, Massachusetts, the home of L. H. Green who developed the community starting in 1901, when the Long Island Rail Road (LIRR) started offering train service to the area. Today, the Auburndale station on the LIRR's Port Washington Branch continues to provide regular service to and from Manhattan.

Auburndale is located in Queens Community District 11 and its ZIP Code is 11358. It is patrolled by the New York City Police Department's 111th Precinct.

Demographics
Based on data from the 2010 United States Census, the population of Auburndale was 19,996, a decrease of 205 (1.0%) from the 20,201 counted in 2000.

The racial makeup of the neighborhood was 44.8% (8,954) White, 1.0% (209) African American, 0.1% (12) Native American, 40.9% (8,169) Asian, 0.0% Pacific Islander, 0.1% (25) from other races, and 1.4% (284) from two or more races. Hispanic or Latino of any race were 11.7% (2,343) of the population.

Architecture
The most common style of house in Auburndale is the Tudor. The Auburndale Improvement Association, along with other groups, seeks "to preserve the neighborhood’s small-scale, lawns-and-driveways character, which in some respects seems to have more in common with nearby suburban Nassau County than New York."

Along with Tudors, capacious Dutch colonials and Cape Cod houses also abound. Home prices range from $499,000 to roughly $1.5 million, averaging at around $650,000.

Education
New York City Department of Education operates Auburndale's public schools. Francis Lewis High School is the largest public high school in the neighborhood.

Queens Public Library operates the Auburndale Branch at 25-55 Francis Lewis Boulevard.

Transportation

Auburndale's highways include the Clearview Expressway (I-295) and the Long Island Expressway (I-495). Auburndale is connected to Manhattan, northern Queens and Long Island by the Auburndale station, one of a few express stations on the Long Island Rail Road's Port Washington Branch. The New York City Subway's  serves nearby Flushing at Flushing–Main Street station. New York City Bus's  local routes, and the  express route. The Nassau Inter-County Express'  route also serves Auburndale.

References

Neighborhoods in Queens, New York